Oldmeldrum (commonly known as Meldrum) is a village and parish in the Formartine area of Aberdeenshire, not far from Inverurie in North East Scotland. With a population of around 2,187, Oldmeldrum falls within Scotland's top 300 centres of population.  Oldmeldrum is home to one of the oldest whisky distilleries in Scotland, Glen Garioch, which was built in 1797. Local industries are agriculture and engineering services connected to the oil industry in Aberdeen.

Prehistory and archaeology 
Archaeological excavations in advance of the construction of a new bypass road around the north of Oldmeldrum, in the summer 2005, revealed the remains of three Bronze Age ring-ditch roundhouses.  The archaeologists believe that the houses that might be part of an area of open settlement which means the first settlement at Oldmeldrum was 3500 years ago.

History
The Battle of Barra was fought in May 1308 (some say earlier) near the Hill of Barra between the armies of Scots King Robert Bruce and John Comyn, 3rd Earl of Buchan. Oldmeldrum was made a burgh of barony in 1672. The parish of Meldrum was known as "Bethelnie" until 1684. It was a centre of the hosiery trade in the 18th century. Oldmeldrum Burgh had a population of 1,110 in 1911 and 1,103 in 1951. By the 2001 census the population stood at 2,003 and had risen to 2,187 by 2006.

Culture and community
On the third Saturday of June, Oldmeldrum is host to the popular "Meldrum Sports," which features highland games, highland dancing, piping, five-a-side football, displays, stalls, and a beer tent. The Sports were first held in 1930, when a group of residents got together to raise funds to provide cocoa to the local children. There has also been an Arts and Music Festival in Oldmeldrum; this has been held in March 2005, 2006, 2007, and 2009 by the Rotary Club to promote local singers, musicians, artists, and photographers.

Oldmeldrum has a primary school and a secondary school, the Meldrum Academy, which also includes the local library. A skatepark was built in June 2009 within Oldmeldrum Pleasure Park, a community park to the east of the main Banff to Aberdeen Road.

Landmarks
Results indicated that it has had at least three phases of fortification: before 500 BC, after 500 BC and again by the Picts around AD 400.

To the north of the village is Meldrum House, a mansion and castle built in the 17th century, and which is now a hotel and golf course. Oldmeldrum Town Hall was completed in 1877.

To the east of the village is the Oldmeldrum Golf Club. Founded in 1885, its 14th fairway contains a rock where John Comyn, Earl of Buchan is said to have lain and lamented his loss to Robert the Bruce at the Battle of Barra. In 2006, a 72-year-old golfer died in a bunker on the first hole. Also to the east of Oldmeldrum is the ruined Tolquhon Castle which is noted for its highly ornamented gatehouse. The castle was built between 1584 and 1589 and is now maintained by Historic Scotland; the castle is open to the public during the summer months.

Oldmeldrum is home to one of the oldest whisky distilleries in Scotland, Glen Garioch, which was built in 1797. Glen Garioch's visitor centre is open year-round and includes tours of the working distillery.

From Oldmeldrum, there are good views of nearby Bennachie (mountain).

Images

Transport
The A947 road from Aberdeen to Banff runs through the centre of the village. Old Meldrum railway station served Oldmeldrum on a line from Inverurie through Lethenty and Lochter until 1965.

Famous residents
 George Chrystal, a mathematician.
 Douglas Scott Falconer, a geneticist.
 William Forsyth, a botanist (yellow forsythia named after him) and ancestor of Bruce Forsyth. The William Forsyth Community Garden opened in Oldmeldrum in 2008.
 Donald Gordon, a Canadian businessman.
 William Keith, a California landscape artist
 Sir Patrick Manson, the founder of the field of tropical medicine, was born at Cromlet Hill, now a guesthouse.
 George Smith Morris and Willie Kemp, Doric musicians related by marriage.
 Sir George Watt, botanist in India
 JJ Bull, Football journalist with The Athletic's TIFO Football, formally with Telegraph Football. Known as The Mallard.

References

External links
 Meldrum Online - Community Website

Villages in Aberdeenshire